The 2002 Swiss Figure Skating Championships (officially named  and ) were held in Zürich-Oerlikon from December 20 through 22, 2001. Medals were awarded in the disciplines of men's singles, ladies' singles, and ice dancing.

Senior results

Men

Ladies

Ice dancing

External links
 results

Swiss Figure Skating Championships
2001 in figure skating